The Arcade & Attica Railroad  is a shortline railroad that hauls freight between Arcade and North Java, New York. The railroad originally connected Arcade with Attica, however the right of way from North Java north to Attica was abandoned in 1957 due to flooding on the Tonawanda Creek.

The principal business of the ARA is handling agricultural products (soy beans, corn, and fertilizer), lumber, dairy feed, and other commodities between Arcade and North Java.  ARA continues to use its GE 80-ton centercab switcher no. 113 as primary freight power, and often will double-head 113 with its GE 65-tonner no. 112 to make switching operations easier at both ends of the line.  The freight service operates as needed.

The ARA also runs passenger excursion trains from May to October on Friday, Saturday, and Sunday.  Passengers can enjoy a  ride from Arcade to Curriers Station and back on restored 1920s-era Boonton passenger coaches, and an open gondola, pulled by the historic Arcade & Attica 18 (currently undergoing a full rebuild) or 1940s- and '50s-era diesel engines.

History
The Arcade and Attica Railroad was the latest in a long succession of railroads planned and built through the Tonawanda Valley in Wyoming County.

In 1836 the Attica and Sheldon Railroad was proposed, but no construction ever took place.

In 1852 the Attica and Alleghany Valley Railroad was incorporated to build a  narrow gauge railway from Attica, through Arcade, to the Pennsylvania state line.  in 1853 the contract was let for construction and most of the road was graded between Attica and Arcade. In 1855 construction was discontinued and the property was sold at foreclosure on February 2, 1856.

On February 28, 1870, the Attica and Arcade Railroad was organized and began purchasing the right of way with construction of the line scheduled for completion by October 1, 1876.  The railroad went bankrupt in 1873 without ever completing the railroad.

On April 5, 1880, the Tonawanda Valley Railroad was incorporated with major financial backing from the Erie Railroad. On September 11, 1880, the first train ran on the line from Attica to Curriers Corners. In October 1880 the Tonawanda Valley Extension Railroad was organized to extend the line from Curriers to Sardinia. By that winter the company changed its mind and began building to Arcade, rather than Sardinia. By May 1, 1881, the line had reached Arcade. On July 14, 1881, the Tonawanda Valley and Cuba Railroad was formed to extend the line from Arcade to Cuba via Sandusky and Rushford. On August 27, 1881, the Tonawanda Valley Railroad, Tonawanda Valley Extension Railroad, and Tonawanda Valley and Cuba were merged into the new Tonawanda Valley and Cuba Railroad. By September 4, 1882, the line was complete between Attica and Cuba. The Company built facilities to transfer to the standard-gauge Erie Railroad in Attica and Cuba. In Cuba, the company made a connection with the Bradford, Eldred and Cuba, another narrow-gauge railroad controlled by the Erie.

By September 1884 the company was defaulting on its bonds and November 29 the company was in receivership. The company's fortunes fell further when the Bradford, Eldred and Cuba went bankrupt. The company limped along until October 30, 1886, when it stopped its service from Cuba to Sandusky. On January 19, 1891, the section from Attica to Freedom was sold to bondholders and in May of that year the Attica and Freedom Railroad was formed. The line went bankrupt and was sold in April 1894.

On October 13, 1894, the Buffalo, Attica and Arcade Railroad was formed to operate the line. The new management switched the line to standard gauge and by January 1895 the Attica to Curriers section was operating again. By December of that year the line was open and running from Attica to Arcade. By December 1897 the company had laid a  segment to connect with the Pennsylvania Railroad near Arcade. By January 1902 the company had built a line from Arcade to Sandusky with the ultimate goal of reaching Crystal Lake, Illinois. In August that same year, a flood washed out much of the line between Arcade and Sandusky along with the connection to the Pennsylvania RR.

In 1904 the BA&A was sold to the Buffalo and Susquehanna Railroad which connected the BA&A in Arcade. The B&S operated the line until 1913 when it was sold to W. L. Kann of Pittsburgh.  Under Kann the railroad declined and lost money until operations were suspended in the winter of 1916/17.

On May 23, 1917, the Arcade and Attica (A&A) Railroad was formed by local investors to operate the line.  The line had its ups and downs, but survived. It had the enviable distinction of not laying off a single employee during the Great Depression. In 1941 the company purchased a 44-ton diesel from General Electric.  The diesel was more dependable and much less expensive to operate than the steam locomotives. Many people credit the diesel for preventing the A&A from going bankrupt in 1941.  The Arcade and Attica operated a passenger service until 1951 when the Erie stopped providing a service on the Buffalo-Hornell line, including the connection with the A&A in Attica.  In 1957 the line was abandoned between Attica and North Java because of severe washouts in the spring of that year.

During the 1960s the Arcade & Attica struck its mark when Borden's debuted the non-dairy creamer 'Cremora'. Until the facility's closure in 1970 the Arcade facility was the sole production plant in the United States for Cremora. The Arcade & Attica railroad brought in the raw supplies and shipped out the finished product across America. The famous orange & white boxcars, and later blue & white ones, were used to ship product throughout the country.

On Saturday, May 27, 2017, the railroad held a celebration marking the corporation's 100th Anniversary. Part of the festivities included the first time in history that steam locomotive No.18 was turned on the wye to face railroad south. Until this weekend, it has always faced north. Other festivities included speeches at the station, employee photographs, a ribbon cutting ceremony, and a cake cutting at the Curriers Depot.

Excursion line

Railroad freight traffic started to decline due to the inroads being made by the automobile and trucking industries following World War II and the Arcade & Attica wasn't immune. A solution was to purchase a light steam locomotive and a couple of passenger coaches for a tourist excursion service. After a few years of searching, A&A management purchased a 2-8-0 #18 from the Boyne City Railroad in Michigan and two commuter coaches from the Delaware, Lackawanna and Western Railroad. For 27 days, the A&A offered passenger excursions in 1962. The following year, #14, a 4-6-0, was purchased from the Escanaba and Lake Superior Railroad and more coaches were added. Now the Arcade and Attica runs all 6 coaches per run with an open air gondola used from United States Air Force

Locomotive roster

Arcade & Attica 14: (4-6-0) - Built in February 1917 by the Baldwin Locomotive Works in Philadelphia, Pennsylvania; currently in storage as it requires a very expensive overhaul to comply with federal safety standards
Arcade & Attica 18: (2-8-0) - Built in 1920 American Locomotive Company at its 'Cooke Works' in Paterson, New Jersey. Currently out of service undergoing a full rebuild in Syracuse, NY, with reassembly scheduled to begin in Spring of 2021.
Arcade & Attica 110: (GE 44-ton switcher) - Built in 1941 by General Electric at its Erie, Pennsylvania, plant, #110 is considered to have 'dieselized' the A&A single-handedly; now on static display in the municipal parking lot across Main Street from the Arcade station. (Out of service)
Arcade & Attica 111: (GE 44-ton switcher) - Built in 1947 by General Electric at its Erie, Pennsylvania, plant, #111 completed the job, and the last A&A steamer was scrapped. (Under Restoration)
Arcade & Attica 112: (GE 65-ton switcher) - Built in 1945 by General Electric at its Erie, Pennsylvania, plant, for the United States Navy. After used in the Navy 112 went out to Colorado for switching work before being acquired by the ARA in 1988.
Arcade & Attica 113: (GE 50-ton switcher shell with weighted trucks, making 113 an industrial 80 tonner) - Built in 1959 by General Electric at its Erie, Pennsylvania, plant. This locomotive operated at the Consolidated Edison plant on Staten Island before being acquired by the ARA in 2014, relegating aging no. 111 to backup duties for freight and passenger trains.

References

External links

Arcade & Attica Railroad company website
History of the Tonawanda Valley and Cuba Railroad between Attica and Cuba, New York, with interactive map.

New York (state) railroads
Heritage railroads in New York (state)
Railway companies established in 1917
Transportation in Wyoming County, New York
American companies established in 1917